Morrocroft is a historic home located at Charlotte, Mecklenburg County, North Carolina. It was designed by architect Harrie T. Lindeberg and built between 1925 and 1927. It is a Colonial Revival/Tudor Revival style brick manor house. It consists of a main two story block ( stories on the rear facade) with rambling -story side wings. It is characterized by picturesque massing, rhythmic spacing of mullioned, multipaned grouped windows, and numerous multi-stack chimneys rising from steeply pitched gable roofs. It was built by North Carolina Governor and Congressman Cameron A. Morrison (1869-1953).

The Morrison family owned the home until 1981. It was listed on the National Register of Historic Places in 1983.

References

Houses on the National Register of Historic Places in North Carolina
Tudor Revival architecture in North Carolina
Colonial Revival architecture in North Carolina
Houses completed in 1927
Houses in Charlotte, North Carolina
National Register of Historic Places in Mecklenburg County, North Carolina